Falsoropica is a genus of beetles in the family Cerambycidae. It was circumscribed by Stephan von Breuning in 1939.

, it consists of the following species:

 Falsoropica albopunctata Breuning & Villiers, 1983
 Falsoropica clavipes Breuning, 1939
 Falsoropica grossepunctata Breuning, 1965
 Falsoropica hawaiana Breuning, 1982

 Falsoropica lata Breuning, 1960
 Falsoropica minuta Breuning, 1961
 Falsoropica orousseti Breuning & Villiers, 1983
 Falsoropica sikkimensis Breuning, 1973
 Falsoropica tonkinensis Breuning, 1960

References

Further reading
 

Apomecynini
Cerambycidae genera
Taxa named by Stephan von Breuning (entomologist)